The 24th Toronto Film Critics Association Awards, honoring the best in film for 2020, were announced on February 7, 2021.

Anne at 13,000 ft was declared the winner of the Rogers Best Canadian Film Award in the virtual gala held March 9, 2021.

The award presentation, hosted by Lainey Lui and Kathleen Newman-Bremang, was livestreamed on the internet. Lui and Newman-Bremang received a Canadian Screen Award nomination for Best Host in a Web Program or Series at the 10th Canadian Screen Awards in 2022.

Winners

References

2020
2020 film awards
2020 in Toronto
2020 in Canadian cinema